Abdul Latif Ibrahimi (17 October 1958 – 9 June 2021) was a Governor of the Afghan Provinces Kunduz, Samangan, Faryab and Takhar.

Biography
Abdul Latif Ibrahimi was member of the Ibrahims Clan, a predominant family in the Imam Sahib district in Kunduz. Imam Sahib is situated on the border with Tajikistan. It is a fertile agrarian district. Accordingly, the district is strategically very significant. The people of Imam Sahib loved Ibrahimi, he was very humble person. After the war Abdul Latif Ibrahimi became Governor of the Province. He was removed two years later and served a short term as Governor of Faryab and of Takhar.

Ibrahimi died from COVID-19 in Kabul on 9 June 2021, at age 62, during the COVID-19 pandemic in Afghanistan.

Notes

Governors of Faryab Province
Governors of Takhar Province
Governors of Kunduz Province
1958 births
2021 deaths
Deaths from the COVID-19 pandemic in Afghanistan
People from Kunduz Province